Jordy van de Corput (born 15 April 1989 in Rotterdam) is a retired Dutch footballer who played in the position of goalkeeper.

Club career
Visiting Launceston for four days in November 2016, Van de Corput featured for City in a preseason friendly hosting Total Futbol International and agreed to a deal for the 2014 Victory League. Tipped to be one of the best in the league and making what was seen as an innumerable amount of saves in a friendly away to Glenorchy Knights, the Dutch goal minder picked up a suspension in the third round, a 3–7 rout by Devonport, missing the next game with Nick Abougelis taking his place.

From 2017 to 2018, he played with Pakruojis in the Lithuanian I Lyga.

References

External links 
 Lietuvos Futbolas Profile
 SportsTG Profile
 at Soccerway

1989 births
Living people
Dutch expatriate footballers
Expatriate soccer players in Australia
Launceston City FC players
Dutch footballers
Expatriate footballers in Lithuania
Association football goalkeepers
ASWH players
FC Dordrecht players
FC Den Bosch players
FC Džiugas players
Footballers from Rotterdam
FC Utrecht players
FC Pakruojis players
21st-century Dutch people